Hotspur Resorts is a wholly owned US subsidiary of Canada's Larco Hospitality (LH). Larco Hospitality was formed in 1998 to manage a hotel portfolio owned by Larco Investments Ltd., and two additional hotels owned by other investment groups. The Vancouver Airport Marriott, Larco Hospitality's first JW Marriott Resort property, opened in June 1998.

History 
 In June 1999, LH opened the first ever franchise hotel in Canada for Hilton Hotels Corporation, the Hilton Vancouver Airport. Also In 1999, Larco acquired the SkyDome Hotel in Toronto and LH now operates it as the Renaissance Toronto Hotel at SkyDome.
 The 548 room JW Marriott Resort in Las Vegas was purchased by Hotspur Nevada Resorts in November 2001. Larco's US subsidiary began providing management consulting and advisory services in December 2001.
 The company is working on re-opening the Renaissance Toronto Airport Hotel and is now the Sheraton Toronto Airport.
 The Toronto Marriott Bloor Yorkville is another hotel under Larco Hospitality.
 Larco Hospitality was involved in a precedent setting lawsuit surrounding labor law jurisdiction due to the termination of a Canadian Employee in America.   
Larco Hospitality is the largest full-service Franchise Hotel Management Company in Canada for Marriott International.

References

Convention centres in Canada
Hospitality companies of the United States
Marriott International

http://www.canlii.org/en/on/onca/doc/2005/2005canlii3197/2005canlii3197.html